Zhopa (literally: arse) is a studio album by Auktyon, recorded in 1990.

Issues of this album
In 1990, the album was released in a truncated form and was called "Duplo". It got its current name in the 1992 CD reissue of this album. The album was named after the body-part that Auktyon dancer Vladimir Veselkin displayed regularly during performances by the band during their 1989 overseas tour which received media attention within the USSR.  On December 30, 2011, it was reissued with bonuses: recordings of Auktyon's performances at the Theater on Fontanka (01/20/1990) and in Togliatti (09/08/1990), at the VIII Leningrad Rock Festival (03/12/1991) and the Rock of Pure Water festival in Volgograd (05/22/1990).

As in previous albums, the songwriter was Leonid Fedorov. The authorship of the lyrics belongs to Oleg Garkusha (except for the song "Yabeda" - its text was written by Dmitry Ozersky).

Tracklist

Original 1990 vinyl issue 
 Pioneer (05:12)
 Nemoi (05:19)
 Boyus' (05:56)
 Yabeda (04:33)
 Samolyot (06:14)
 Lyobov' (05:54)
 Vru (05:33)
 Ubyut (04:20)

Переиздание 1992 года (записи на CD) 
 Kolpak (06:00)
 Nemoi (05:23)
 Pioneer (05:27)
 Boyus' (06:01)
 Yabeda (04:38)
 Samolyot (06:19)
 Lyubov' (06:03)
 Vru (05:36)
 Vyzhit' (05:03)
 Ubyut (04:27)

References

1990 albums